The following is a list of the 100 municipalities (comuni) of the Province of Potenza, Basilicata, Italy.

List

References

Istituto Nazionale di Statistica (ISTAT)

External links

 
 
Potenza